Sekinchan is a state constituency in Selangor, Malaysia, that has been represented in the Selangor State Legislative Assembly since 1974.

The state constituency was created in the 1974 redistribution and is represented by a single member in the Selangor State Legislative Assembly, chosen under the first-past-the-post voting system. , the State Assemblyman for Sekinchan is Ng Suee Lim from the Democratic Action Party (DAP), which is part of the state's ruling coalition, Pakatan Harapan (PH).

Demographics

History

Polling districts 
According to the federal gazette issued on 30 March 2018, the Sekinchan constituency is divided into 11 polling districts.

Representation history

Election results

References

Selangor state constituencies